Geoff Smith is an Australian former professional rugby league footballer who played in the 1970s and 1980s. He played for North Sydney, Western Suburbs and South Sydney in the NSWRFL competition.

Playing career
Smith made his first grade debut for Western Suburbs in round 9 of the 1974 NSWRFL season against Canterbury-Bankstown at Lidcombe Oval. In 1977, Smith played in Western Suburbs 6-5 victory over Eastern Suburbs in the 1977 Amco Cup final at Leichhardt Oval. In 1978, Smith transferred to North Sydney but only featured in two matches that season. In 1979, Smith played eight matches for Norths as they finished bottom of the table with the Wooden Spoon. In 1982, Smith joined South Sydney but only played one game for the club which was in round 26 against Manly.

References

Western Suburbs Magpies players
North Sydney Bears players
South Sydney Rabbitohs players
Australian rugby league players
Rugby league halfbacks
Year of birth missing (living people)
Living people